Jim Lester is a Canadian politician who served as the Newfoundland and Labrador Member of the House of Assembly for Mount Pearl North from 2017 to 2021.

Lester ran in the 2015 provincial election in Mount Pearl-Southlands, but lost to Liberal candidate Paul Lane. Following the resignation of Steve Kent in 2017, Lester won the PC nomination in Mount Pearl North and subsequently defeated Liberal Jim Burton.

In 2018, Lester endorsed Ches Crosbie in the 2018 provincial PC leadership race.

Lester was re-elected in the 2019 provincial election. In the 2021 provincial election, he was defeated by Liberal candidate Lucy Stoyles.

Lester's family owns and operates the agritourism venture Lester's Farm Inc.

Electoral record

}

|}

|-

|-

|-

|}

References

Politicians from St. John's, Newfoundland and Labrador
Progressive Conservative Party of Newfoundland and Labrador MHAs
Living people
21st-century Canadian politicians
Year of birth missing (living people)